Nikola Jurčević (born 14 September 1966) is a Croatian football current manager and former player who most recently managed the Azerbaijan national team.

Playing career

International
He made his debut for Croatia in a December 1990 friendly match against Romania, coming on as a 66th-minute substitute for Ivan Cvjetković, and earned a total of 19 caps (2 unofficial), scoring 2 goals. Since Croatia was still officially part of Yugoslavia at the time, his first two games were unofficial. His final international was a December 1996 friendly against Morocco.

Managerial career
Jurčević started as a manager of NK Zagreb in 2002, but a year later he became the manager for Dinamo Zagreb. He celebrated the Prva HNL and Croatian Cup in 2004. Later, he managed NK Slaven Belupo. He also worked as an assistant manager for the Croatia national team, assisting his former international teammates Slaven Bilić and Aljoša Asanović. On 18 September 2015, he was appointed as the assistant manager to Bilić at West Ham United. He left the club along with Bilić's other coaching staff when the manager was sacked on 6 November 2017. On 12 March 2018, he was named the manager of Croatian First Football League club Dinamo Zagreb, but he was sacked by club on 15 May 2018, after poor performance in the club. On 11 February 2019, he was named the new head coach for the Azerbaijan football team.
On 13 December 2019, he was sacked as manager of the Azerbaijan national team due to the team's poor performance in the UEFA Euro 2020 qualifying, despite managed a respectable 1–1 draw to his home country Croatia at home.

Career statistics

Scores and results list Croatia's goal tally first, score column indicates score after each Jurčević goal.

Managerial statistics

Honours

As a player
NK Zagreb
Yugoslav Third League (West): 1989–90
Yugoslav Second League: 1990–91

Austria Salzburg
Austrian Bundesliga: 1993–94, 1994–95
UEFA Cup Runner-up: 1993–94

Individual
Austrian Bundesliga top scorer: 1993–94

As a manager
Dinamo Zagreb
Croatian Super Cup: 2003
Croatian Cup: 2004

References

External links

Living people
1966 births
Footballers from Zagreb
Association football midfielders
Association football forwards
Yugoslav footballers
Croatian footballers
Croatia international footballers
UEFA Euro 1996 players
GNK Dinamo Zagreb players
NK Zagreb players
Royal Antwerp F.C. players
FC Red Bull Salzburg players
SC Freiburg players
Yugoslav First League players
Belgian Pro League players
Austrian Football Bundesliga players
Bundesliga players
Yugoslav expatriate footballers
Expatriate footballers in Belgium
Yugoslav expatriate sportspeople in Belgium
Croatian expatriate footballers
Expatriate footballers in Austria
Croatian expatriate sportspeople in Austria
Expatriate footballers in Germany
Croatian expatriate sportspeople in Germany
Croatian football managers
NK Zagreb managers
GNK Dinamo Zagreb managers
FC Red Bull Salzburg managers
NK Slaven Belupo managers
Beşiktaş J.K. non-playing staff
West Ham United F.C. non-playing staff
Azerbaijan national football team managers
Croatian expatriate football managers
Expatriate football managers in Austria
Croatian expatriate sportspeople in Russia
Croatian expatriate sportspeople in Turkey
Croatian expatriate sportspeople in England
Expatriate football managers in Azerbaijan
Croatian expatriate sportspeople in Azerbaijan